Primanti Brothers, sometimes called Primanti’s for short, is a chain of sandwich shops in the eastern United States. Since its founding in 1933 in Pittsburgh, Primanti's has become a cultural icon of the region. The chain is known for its signature sandwiches of grilled meat, melted cheese, an oil and vinegar-based coleslaw, tomato slices, and French fries between two thick slices of Italian bread.

During the 2007 James Beard Foundation Awards, Primanti's was named as one of "America's Classic" restaurants.

History
In 1933 the first Primanti's opened at 46 18th Street in Pittsburgh's Strip District, a busy area along the Allegheny River. At the time, the Strip District was a major industrial center in Pittsburgh filled with factories, warehouses, and shipyards. According to the restaurant, Joe Primanti, born in suburban Wilmerding, Pennsylvania, invented the restaurant's sandwich during the Great Depression. His brothers, Dick and Stanley, later joined him. The Primantis opened their restaurant at Smallman Street and 18th Street in the Strip District which still stands today. The restaurant primarily served the late-night and early-morning workers who were unloading produce.

The tradition of the signature sandwiches (typically ordered by number based on a "menu" written on a huge chalkboard behind the counter) was to combine the sandwich and side of fries, held (grilled) together with eggs as a binding unit, straight from the grill into a hoagie bun. The sandwich was then wrapped in a sheet of newspaper and sold. The sandwich's design and packaging was designed to reduce spillage. 

With the passing of Stanley Primanti in the early 1970s and John in 1974, Dick decided to sell the business to Jim Patrinos in 1975.  Today there are 16 Pittsburgh locations, including at the city's major sports venues PNC Park, Acrisure Stadium, and the PPG Paints Arena, as well as several other locations throughout the eastern United States.

In recent years, it has become tradition for Pittsburgh Steelers NFL Draft Picks to visit the original Primanti Brothers location in the Strip District, Pittsburgh, upon their arrival in Pittsburgh. Notable picks include 2017 NFL Draft 1st round pick T. J. Watt and 2nd round pick, JuJu Smith-Schuster, and 2019 NFL Draft first round pick, Devin Bush Jr.

Sports-themed specials
The chain expressed its support for the Pittsburgh Penguins during their back-to-back Stanley Cup championships in their 2015–16 and 2016–17 seasons, releasing two limited-time sandwiches in their honor. In 2016, it released a limited-time sandwich honoring the team's third line of Carl Hagelin, Nick Bonino and Phil Kessel, named the "HBK Sandwich".  Late into the next season, the chain then introduced a sandwich called the "Canadian Pitts-Burger", honoring goaltender Marc-André Fleury during his eventually final season with the Penguins. The sandwich featured Canadian bacon and was also available at all Primanti Brothers locations for a limited time.

Locations

Primanti Brothers locations are found throughout Pennsylvania, particularly in and around Pittsburgh. In addition to other Pennsylvania locations, restaurants have been established in Fort Lauderdale, Florida; Ohio, West Virginia, Maryland, Michigan and Indiana.

Reception

The restaurant and its signature sandwich have been featured in several national publications and television shows, including National Geographic magazine, Man v. Food, and Adam Richman's Best Sandwich in America. Primanti Brothers made the Pittsburgh Post-Gazettes list of "1,000 Places to See Before You Die in the USA and Canada", and their sandwich is a featured Pittsburgh landmark on Yinztagram.

The restaurant was mentioned on the April 21, 2008, episode of The Daily Show with Jon Stewart in an interview with Senator Barack Obama. Stewart suggested that Obama visit the restaurant for their "great sandwiches", which Stewart had enjoyed as a comedian on the club circuit.

An ESPN.com rating of PNC Park mentioned that "the best [concession] item is the famous Primanti Brothers sandwich, a Pittsburgh institution", and granted this "signature concession item" an exuberant score of "5+++" (out of 5). This helped PNC Park to achieve its overall #1 ranking in the feature.

Credit card lawsuit & settlement
On March 9, 2011, U.S. District Judge David S. Cercone approved a settlement between Primanti Brothers and a customer in response to a lawsuit over the content of credit card receipts. In the suit, the plaintiff, Nora Hoxha, claimed that the restaurant's credit card receipts printed all, or if not all, too many digits of a customer's credit card number in violation of the Fair and Accurate Credit Transactions Act. As part of the settlement, the restaurant agreed to provide affected customers with a free menu item and a side item or non-alcoholic drink. The restaurant also agreed to make a donation of $25,000 to the Carnegie Museums and pay up to $62,000 for the plaintiff's attorneys' costs.

References

External links

 Official website

Fast-food chains of the United States
Restaurants in Pittsburgh
Tourist attractions in Pittsburgh
Regional restaurant chains in the United States
Restaurants established in 1933
1933 establishments in Pennsylvania
Companies based in Pittsburgh
James Beard Foundation Award winners